Carya tonkinensis, the Vietnam hickory, is a species of flowering plant in the genus Carya native to Assam in India, southern China, and northern Indochina. Local people harvest the wood for timber and furniture making, and collect the edible nuts for vegetable oil production.

References

tonkinensis
Plants described in 1921